ErmC 23S rRNA methyltransferase may refer to:

 23S rRNA (adenine2085-N6)-dimethyltransferase, an enzyme
 RRNA (adenine-N6-)-methyltransferase, an enzyme